Hélder Costa (born 1939, in Grândola) is a Portuguese dramatist and playwright. He is director of the theatre company A Barraca which is based at the Teatro Cinearte in Lisbon.

References

1939 births
People from Grândola
Living people
20th-century Portuguese dramatists and playwrights
20th-century Portuguese male writers
Portuguese male dramatists and playwrights